Experimental Gerontology is a monthly peer-reviewed medical journal covering biogerontology. It was established in 1964 and is published by Elsevier. The editor-in-chief is Christiaan Leeuwenburgh (University of Florida College of Medicine). According to the Journal Citation Reports, the journal has a 2019 impact factor of 3.376.

References

External links

Gerontology journals
Publications established in 1964
Elsevier academic journals
Monthly journals
English-language journals